A Couple of Hamburgers is a 1935 short story by James Thurber, the American writer, considered to be one of his best.

It is a thumbnail sketch of a couple in a dysfunctional marriage.

It has been suggested that while The Secret Life of Walter Mitty, arguably Thurber's best-known short story, is a comical story with a tragic side, this is a tragic story with a comical side.

References

1935 short stories
Works by James Thurber
Works originally published in The New Yorker